Notts, Lincs & Derbyshire 1 was a tier 9 English Rugby Union league with teams from Nottinghamshire, Lincolnshire and Derbyshire taking part.  Promoted teams moved up to Midlands 4 East (North) (formerly Midlands East 2) and relegated teams dropped to Notts, Lincs & Derbyshire 2.

At the end of the 1999–00 season the Notts, Lincs & Derbyshire leagues were merged with the Leicestershire leagues.  This meant that Notts, Lincs & Lincolnshire 1 was cancelled after 13 seasons and all non-promoted teams transferred into the newly introduced Notts, Lincs & Derbyshire/Leicestershire 1 East and Notts, Lincs & Derbyshire/Leicestershire 1 West divisions.

Original teams

When league rugby began in 1987 this division contained the following teams:

Boston
Chesterfield Panthers
Glossop
Grimsby
Kesteven
Mellish
Nottingham Moderns
Scunthorpe
Southwell
West Bridgford
Worksop

Notts, Lincs & Derbyshire 1 honours

Notts, Lincs & Derbyshire 1 (1987–1992)

The original Notts, Lincs & Derbyshire 1 was a tier 7 league.  Promotion was to Midlands 2 East and relegation to Notts, Lincs & Derbyshire 2.

Notts, Lincs & Derbyshire 1 (1992–1993)

Restructuring of the Midlands leagues saw Notts, Lincs & Derbyshire 1 drop two levels to become a tier 9 league.  Promotion was to the newly introduced Midlands East 2, while relegation continued to Notts, Lincs & Derbyshire 2.

Notts, Lincs & Derbyshire 1 (1993–1996)

The top six teams from Midlands 1 and the top six from North 1 were combined to create National 5 North, meaning that Notts, Lincs & Derbyshire 1 dropped another level to become a tier 10 league.  Promotion continued to Midlands East 2 and relegation to Notts, Lincs & Derbyshire 2.

Notts, Lincs & Derbyshire 1 (1996–2000)

At the end of the 1995–96 season National 5 North was discontinued and Notts, Lincs & Derbyshire 1 returned to being a tier 9 league.  Promotion continued to Midlands East 2 and relegation to Notts, Lincs & Derbyshire 2. At the end of the 1999–00 season Notts, Lincs & Derbyshire 1 was cancelled due to Midlands league restructuring and non-promoted sides transferred into the newly introduced Notts, Lincs & Derbyshire/Leicestershire 1 East and Notts, Lincs & Derbyshire/Leicestershire 1 West.

Number of league titles

Chesterfield Panthers (2)
Amber Valley (1)
Ashbourne (1)
Ashfield (1)
Buxton (1)
Glossop (1)
Grimsby (1)
Ilkeston (1)
Long Eaton (1)
Mellish (1)
Nottingham Moderns (1)
Scunthorpe (1)

Notes

See also
Notts, Lincs & Derbyshire 2
Notts, Lincs & Derbyshire 3
Notts, Lincs & Derbyshire 4
Notts, Lincs & Derbyshire 5
Midlands RFU
Notts, Lincs & Derbyshire RFU
English rugby union system
Rugby union in England

References

External links
 NLD RFU website

9
Rugby union in Nottinghamshire
Rugby union in Derbyshire
Rugby union in Lincolnshire
Sports leagues established in 1987
Sports leagues disestablished in 2000